Urubu is a 1948 American adventure film directed by George P. Breakston and Yorke Coplen, written by Patrick Whyte, and starring George P. Breakston and Yorke Coplen. The film was released on September 24, 1948, by United Artists.

Plot

Cast  
George P. Breakston as George
Yorke Coplen as Narrator

References

External links 
 
 http://urubu.club

1948 films
American black-and-white films
United Artists films
1948 adventure films
American adventure films
Films directed by George Breakston
Films scored by Albert Glasser
1940s English-language films
1940s American films